The Longdon-on-Tern Aqueduct, near Longdon-on-Tern in Shropshire, was one of the first two canal aqueducts to be built from cast iron.

History
The cast iron canal aqueduct was re-engineered by Thomas Telford after the first construction designed by William Clowes was swept away by floods. It was built in 1796 to carry the Shrewsbury Canal across the River Tern near Longdon-on-Tern in Shropshire. The  aqueduct was opened one month after Benjamin Outram's  cast iron Holmes Aqueduct on the Derby Canal, the world's first cast iron canal aqueduct. Since the closure of the Shrewsbury Canal in 1944, the aqueduct has been disused. The aqueduct is an Historic England Grade I listed building and has been on the register since 30 March 1971.

Description

See also
Grade I listed buildings in Shropshire
Listed buildings in Rodington, Shropshire

References

Bridges completed in 1796
Grade I listed bridges
Grade I listed buildings in Shropshire
Bridges by Thomas Telford
Shrewsbury Canal
Cast iron aqueducts
1796 establishments in Great Britain